Electra was a brand of electric guitars and basses manufactured in Japan and distributed in the US by two companies owned by brothers: Saint Louis Music (SLM) and Pacific Coast Music in the 1970s and early 1980s. In 2013, the brand launched a successful comeback led by renowned luthiers Ben Chafin and Mick Donner.

Unlike most other brands of imported guitars which were sourced from a single manufacturer, Electra guitars were ordered from all the Japanese factories and distributors. As a result, early models especially vary in details and quality. Later, as all models came to be made by Matsumoku, Electra guitars offered high quality at competitive prices. However, the brand never entirely lost its association with inexpensive 'copy' guitars and the brand name was transitioned to Electra Westone in 1984 and Westone in 1985. The same qualities make them popular among collectors today.

In 2013 Ben Chafin, former head luthier at Dean Guitars, acquired the rights to Electra Guitars and is now producing new Electra Guitars. The first model available was a reissued and updated single cutaway Electra Omega, followed by the Omega Prime. After rave reviews and a growing roster of artist endorsements, Electra Guitars unveiled a number of new models in 2014 including the Invicta, Talon, Phoenix H & S Guitars and the Phoenix Bass. More about the current company and their guitars, basses, accessories and merchandise can be found at their official website Electra Guitars

MPC Guitars

In 1976 Electra MPC (Modular Powered Circuits) models featured a pair of cartridge slots in the guitar body, which allowed effect modules to be plugged in and controlled from the front of the guitar. Today the unusual thing is that the effects are on board, but even offering electronic effects to consumer musicians was fairly new at the time and offers an interesting alternate way to do it. 
There were a total of 18 guitar models which carried MPC circuits. The most notable was the Super Rock, which was a Les Paul copy. There were 12 total MPC modules offered.

Table of MPC modules

In the assortment of modules offered was a "Mini Amp" module, which contained no effects but was a headphone amplifier for the guitar.  This mini amp was actually the number 11 Module, Frog Nose.  It did nothing except send a fairly weak clean guitar signal to headphones via the jack.

Endorsers of Electra guitars and basses 
Peter Frampton - Peter Frampton's Official Site
Leslie West
Electric Light Orchestra
Allen "Free Bird" Collins of Lynyrd Skynyrd
Outlaws
Rick Derringer's brand was the X910 guitar also known as the "Derringer" model
Marty Friedman (uses in live performances/workshops etc.)
Dickey Betts endorsed the X930 MPC model in the October 1981 issue of Guitar Player magazine.
Aum Mu Ra -

Sources 

 Article from the original Electra fan site
 Details of MPC guitar wiring
 1977 full line catalog including MPC guitars and modules

External links
 Electra Guitars Official Website of Electra Guitars
 The Electra Guitar Page- Index of Models latest known listing of guitar and bass models
 The Electra Guitar Page (original) archival mirror of original Electra fan site
 The Electra Forum fan community of collectors and players
 Matsumoku Industrial- One manufacturer of Electra guitars
 The Guitars of Matsumoku information on Matsumoku-made guitars

Manufacturing companies established in 1971
1971 establishments in Japan
Musical instrument manufacturing companies of Japan